The 1951 Morris Brown Wolverines football team was an American football team that represented Morris Brown College in the Southern Intercollegiate Athletic Conference (SIAC) during the 1951 college football season. In their second season under head coach Edward Clemons, the team compiled a 10–1 record, defeated  in the Tropical Bowl, and outscored all opponents by a total of 449 to 56.  

The Morris Brown team was rated by the Pittsburgh Courier as the 1951 black college national champion, ahead of second-place Florida A&M and third-place Tennessee A&I. The Associated Negro Press rated Morris Brown second behind North Carolina A&T but acknowledged that "Morris Brown has just as great a claim to the title because it was the nation's best offensive and defensive team."

Schedule

References

Morris Brown
Morris Brown Wolverines football seasons
Black college football national champions
Morris Brown Wolverines football